Iván G. Ochoa (born December 16, 1982) is a Venezuelan former professional baseball shortstop. He played in Major League Baseball (MLB) for the San Francisco Giants in 2008. Ochoa is from Guacara, Venezuela.

Professional career

Cleveland Indians
Ochoa was signed as a free agent by the Cleveland Indians on May 3, .

San Francisco Giants
After the 2006 season, Ochoa signed with the San Francisco Giants and was invited to spring training. Ochoa started  in Triple-A again, but was called up to the major league team after batting .318 and stealing 20 bases in 84 games. He made his major league debut on July 12,  against the Chicago Cubs. His first hit was a double to left field in the ninth inning off of Carlos Mármol. He appeared in 47 games for the Giants, batting .200.

Boston Red Sox
Ochoa was released after the 2008 season by the Giants and signed with the Boston Red Sox on January 27, . He appeared in 45 games for the AAA Pawtucket Red Sox before he was released on August 19, 2009.

Golden Baseball League
He played with the Tijuana Cimarrones of the Golden Baseball League in 2010, appearing in 19 games.

Los Angeles Dodgers
Ochoa was signed by the Los Angeles Dodgers on February 10, 2011 and assigned to the AA Chattanooga Lookouts, where he appeared in 84 games and hit .233. He was promoted to the AAA Albuquerque Isotopes at the end of the season and appeared in 18 games for them, hitting .257.

See also
 List of Major League Baseball players from Venezuela

External links
, or Retrosheet, or Pura Pelota (Venezuelan Winter League)

1982 births
Living people
Akron Aeros players
Albuquerque Isotopes players
Buffalo Bisons (minor league) players
Burlington Indians players (1986–2006)
Caribes de Anzoátegui players
Caribes de Oriente players
Chattanooga Lookouts players
Columbus RedStixx players
Fresno Grizzlies players
Gulf Coast Red Sox players
Kinston Indians players
Leones del Caracas players
Major League Baseball players from Venezuela
Major League Baseball shortstops
Pawtucket Red Sox players
People from Carabobo
San Francisco Giants players
Tijuana Cimarrones players
Venezuelan expatriate baseball players in the United States